This is a list of debuggers: computer programs that are used to test and debug other programs.

Debuggers 

Advanced Debugger — The standard UNIX debugger
Allinea DDT — graphical debugger for debugging multithreaded and multiprocess applications on Linux platforms
AQtime — profiler and memory/resource debugger for Windows
ARM Development Studio 5 (DS-5)
CA/EZTEST — was a CICS interactive test/debug software package
CodeView — was a debugger for the DOS platform
dbx — a proprietary source-level debugger for Pascal/Fortran/C/C++ on UNIX platforms
DEBUG — the built-in debugger of DOS and Microsoft Windows
Dragonfly (Opera) — JavaScript and HTML DOM debugger
Dr. Memory — a DynamoRIO-based memory debugger
Dynamic debugging technique (DDT), and its octal counterpart Octal Debugging Technique
FusionDebug — interactive debugger for Adobe ColdFusion, Railo, and Lucee CFML Engines
FusionReactor — interactive IDE style debugger which includes various extensions/controls for allowing debugging of Java in production environments
GNU Debugger
Parasoft Insure++ — a multi-platform memory debugger
Intel Debugger
Interactive Disassembler (IDA Pro)
Java Platform Debugger Architecture
Jinx — a whole-system debugger for heisenbugs. It works transparently as a device driver.
JSwat — open-source Java debugger
LLDB
MacsBug — a debugger for the classic Mac OS
Memcheck — a Valgrind-based memory debugger
Modular Debugger — a C/C++ source level debugger for Solaris and derivates
OllyDbg — a disassembly-based debugger for Windows (GUI)
Omniscient Debugger — Forward and backward debugger for Java
Rational Purify (IBM) — multi-platform memory debugger
sdb — a symbolic debugger for C programs for ancient UNIX platforms
SIMMON (Simulation Monitor)
SoftICE — kernel mode debugger for Windows
SEGGER Ozone — debugger and performance analyser for embedded systems
TRACE32 — in-circuit debugger for embedded systems
Turbo Debugger — Pascal/C/assembly debugger for DOS
Undo LiveRecorder — C, C++, Go, Rust, Java time travel debugger
Ups — C, Fortran source level debugger
Valgrind — Valgrind is a programming tool for memory debugging, memory leak detection, and profiling.
VB Watch — debugger for Visual Basic 6.0
Visual Studio Debugger — debugger for .NET and native Windows applications
WinDbg — multipurpose debugger for Windows
Xdebug — PHP debugger and profiler

Debugger front-ends

 Allinea DDT - a graphical debugger supporting for parallel/multi-process and multithreaded applications, for C/C++ and F90.
 DDD is the standard front-end from the GNU Project. It is a complex tool that works with most common debuggers (GDB, jdb, Python debugger, Perl debugger, Tcl, and others) natively or with some external programs (for PHP).
 Many Eclipse perspectives, e.g. the Java Development Tools (JDT), provide a debugger front-end.
 GDB (the GNU debugger) GUI
Allinea's DDT — a parallel and distributed front-end to a modified version of GDB.
Code::Blocks — A free cross-platform C, C++ and Fortran IDE with a front end for gdb.
CodeLite — An open source, cross platform C/C++ IDE which have front end for gdb, the next version of CodeLite (v6.0) will also include a front end to the LLDB (debugger)
Eclipse C/C++ Development Tools (CDT) —  includes visual debugging tools based on GDB.
Emacs — Emacs editor with built-in support for the GNU Debugger acts as the frontend.
Nemiver — A GDB frontend that integrates well in the GNOME desktop environment.
Qt Creator — multi-platform frontend for GDB, CDB and LLDB.
rr — An open source C/C++ debugger by Mozilla, supporting reproduction of program state and reverse execution
SlickEdit — contains a GDB front-end as well.
Xcode — contains a GDB front-end as well.

Frame debuggers 
Software specializing in debugging of frame rendering.
 CodeXL — development environment including profiling and debugging
 RenderDoc — multi-platform, open source

See also 
Comparison of debuggers
Time travel debugging
Record and replay debugging

References

External links 
 13 Linux Debuggers for C++ Reviewed

Debugger
Debuggers